Berdreyminn is the sixth album by the Icelandic heavy metal band Sólstafir. It was released on May 26, 2017 through the record label Season of Mist.

Track listing

Credits 
Writing, performance and production credits are adapted from the album liner notes.

Personnel

Sólstafir 
 Aðalbjörn Tryggvason – guitar, vocals
 Sæþór M. Sæþórsson – guitar
 Svavar Austmann – bass
 Hallgrímur J. Hallgrímsson – drums, backing vocals

Additional musicians 
 Snorri Sigurðarson – trumpet, flugelhorn
 Ingi Garðar Erlendsson – trombone, tuba
 Erna Ómarsdóttir – french horn
 Halldór Á. Björnsson – piano, keyboards
 Amiina – strings
 Margrét Soffía Einarsdóttir – soprano vocals on "Hula"

Production 
 Birgir Jón Birgirsson – production
 Jaime Gómez Arellano – production, mixing
 Aðalbjörn Tryggvason – production
 Ted Jensen – mastering

Visual art 
 Adam Burke – cover art
 Steinunn Lilja Draumland – photography
 Hippografix – layout
 Jo Geirdal – handwriting, raven

Studios 
 Sundlaugin, Mosfellsbær, Iceland, November – December 2016 – recording
 Orgone studios, Woburn, England, UK – mixing
 Sterling Sound Studios, New York City, NY, USA – mastering

Charts

References

External links 
 Berdreyminn at Sólstafir's official website
 

2017 albums
Season of Mist albums
Sólstafir albums